
The year 502 BC was a year of the pre-Julian Roman calendar. In the Roman Empire it was known as the Year of the Consulship of Tricostus and Viscellinus (or, less frequently, year 252  Ab urbe condita). The denomination 502 BC for this year has been used since the early medieval period, when the Anno Domini calendar era became the prevalent method in Europe for naming years.

Events 
 By place 

 Mediterranean 
 The island of Naxos rebels against the Persian Empire.
 Rome suppresses the Pometian revolt.
 December 4—A solar eclipse darkens Egypt (computed, no clear historical record of observation).

Deaths
 Milo of Croton, ancient Greek wrestler

References

500s BC